Alice Stanley Armitage (24 February 1869 – 30 August 1949) was a campaigner for the blind and principal founder of the National Council for the Blind of Ireland.

Life
Alice Stanley Armitage was born on 24 February 1869. Her parents were Thomas Rhodes Armitage and Harriet Black. Her mother was the heiress of the Noan estate, County Tipperary. Her father founded the Royal National Institute for the Blind in England. She was the niece of painter Edward Armitage.

Armitage was the principal founder of the National Council for the Blind of Ireland on 10 March 1931 under the original name of the National Council for the Welfare of the Blind of Ireland.

Armitage died on 30 August 1949 in Chertsey, Surrey. A plaque was unveiled to a number of the Armitage family members involved in advocacy for the blind and partially sighted at Magorban Church, Cashel in 2006.

References

1869 births
1949 deaths
Founders of charities
20th-century philanthropists